Springsure is a town and a locality in the Central Highlands Region, Queensland, Australia. It is the southern terminus of the Gregory Highway and the northern terminus of the Dawson Highway.

Geography 
Today, Springsure is a pastoral settlement serving cattle farms, and sunflower, sorghum, wheat and chickpea plantations.

Springsure is the hub for several coal mines such as the Minerva Mine and the Rolleston Mine. Significant exploration is ongoing in the district. It is also a staging point for expeditions to Carnarvon National Park.

History
Gangalu (Gangulu, Kangulu, Kanolu, Kaangooloo, Khangulu) is an Australian Aboriginal language spoken on Gangula country. The Gangula language region includes the towns of Clermont and Springsure extending south towards the Dawson River.

Wadja (also known as Wadjigu, Wadya, Wadjainngo, Mandalgu, and Wadjigun) is an Australian Aboriginal language in Central Queensland. The language region includes  the local government areas of the Aboriginal Shire of Woorabinda and Central Highlands Region, including the Blackdown Tablelands. the Comet River, and the Expedition Range, and the towns of Woorabinda, Springsure and Rolleston.

The area had been occupied by Aboriginal people for thousands of years.

Ludwig Leichhardt was the first European to explore the area, doing so between 1843 and 1845. His favourable reports encouraged settlers to move in and settle the land whose domains were those of Aboriginal groups.

In 1861, squatter Horatio Wills and a party of Victorian settlers arrived near modern-day Springsure in 1861. Two weeks later, 19 men women and children, including Wills, were killed by Aboriginal Australian people, the Kairi or Gayiri, in the Cullin-La-Ringo massacre, which was the largest massacre of European settlers by Aboriginal peoples in Australian history. At least 15 Aboriginal men, women and children were killed by the Queensland Native Police and militias of local European colonists and their employees in a series of reprisals over the months that followed. However, the massacre of the 19 European family members was itself a retaliatory response to an earlier shooting of fugitive murderer who was Gayiri tribesman by Jesse Gregson, manager of nearby Rainsworth Station, with Second Lieutenant Alfred March Patrick and Native Police Troops in his command. Prior to the massacre of the 19 colonists, in early 1861 Second Lieutenant Patrick had complained to Charles Dutton, lessee of Bauhinia Downs pastoral lease 148 km south-east of Springsure, that other officers in the Queensland Native Police "...had been able to bag their first Aborigine after only a few weeks in the Force; he had served for six months and still had not yet killed a black." The Old Rainworth Fort was built in 1862 by the colonists of Springsure in order to defend themselves from future raids by Aboriginals. Horatio's son, star cricketer and Australian rules football pioneer Tom Wills, survived the massacre, and remained on site until 1864.

The town takes its name from a pastoral run which was first named Springsure in 1861, after its permanent spring.

The town was surveyed by Charles Frederick Gregory in August 1863.

The Springsure Presbyterian Church in Charles Street opened in about 1866. It closed in March 2011 after 145 years.

Springsure State School opened on 14 March 1870.

On 6 December 1919, the Springsure State School Memorial Fountain was dedicated by Mrs Annie Wheeler (née Laurie), a former pupil at the school. The memorial is a marble fountain and commemorates students of the school who served in World War I.

In March 1925, the Rev. Father Thomas Andrew Sweeney arrived in Springsure to replace Rev. Father Jules Bucas as the Catholic priest for the parish. Sweeney saw that there was a need for a Catholic school in Springsure and set about building a school and a convent for its teachers in August 1925. The architect was Roy Chipps and the builder E.H. Fletcher, both of Rockhampton. In January 1926 the school and the convent opened in a ceremony led by Roman Catholic Bishop of Rockhampton Joseph Shiel.  The convent and school were under the control of Sister Mary Bonaventure of the Sisters of Mercy. The school opened on 2 February 1926 with 64 children. It was originally known as The Convent of the Little Flower, but the name was later changed to Our Lady of the Sacred Heart.

On 16 November 1943, a Douglas C-47A Skytrain broke up in mid-air during a violent storm in the area, and crashed on Rewan Station, just south of Springsure. All 19 people on board the aircraft perished in the crash.

Heritage listings

Springsure has a number of heritage-listed sites, including:
 13 Woodbine Street: Springsure Hospital Museum
 Wealwandangie Road, Cairdbeign: Old Rainworth Stone Store

Attractions
A cliff face in the hills surrounding Springsure is known to the area as Virgin Rock, named because it once looked like the Virgin Mary cradling the baby Jesus. Subsequent  erosion has blurred the original resemblance.

Facilities
Facilities at Springsure include the airport, a caravan park, hospital, motocross track, police station, service station and showground.

The Central Highlands Regional Council operate a public library in Springsure at 27 Eclipse Street.

The Springsure branch of the Queensland Country Women's Association has its rooms at 27 Eclipse Street.

Education 
Springsure State School is a government primary and secondary (Prep-10) school for boys and girls at 55 Eclipse Street. In 2017, the school had an enrolment of 158 students with 21 teachers (16 full-time equivalent) and 14 non-teaching staff (8 full-time equivalent). The school motto is 'Success by Effort'.

Our Lady of the Sacred Heart Catholic Primary School is a Catholic primary (Prep-6) school for boys and girls at Gap Street. In 2017, the school had an enrolment of 50 students with 7 teachers (6 full-time equivalent) and 6 non-teaching staff (2 full-time equivalent).

There is no secondary education for Years 11 and 12 in Springsure; the nearest school offering secondary education for these years is in Emerald.

Notable residents
 John Denis Fryer, after whom the Fryer Library at the University of Queensland is named
 John Humphreys, Olympic fencer
 Roy Moore, U.S. judge and Senate candidate, worked on the Telemon cattle station outside town in 1984.
Keith Slater, Anglican priest in Springsure, later Bishop of Grafton
Theophilus Wilson, cricketer

Gallery

See also

References

External links

 University of Queensland: Queensland Places: Springsure
 Town map of Springsure, 1989

 
Towns in Queensland
Central Highlands Region
Localities in Queensland